Claudio Martino was an Argentine stage and film actor.

Selected filmography
 My Country's Wings (1939)
 Seven Women (1944)
 This Is My Life (1952)

References

Bibliography
 Jorge Abel Martín. Cine argentino. Ediciones Corregidor, 1978.

External links

Year of birth unknown
1979 deaths
Argentine male film actors
Argentine male stage actors